Michel Stollsteiner (born 26 January 1956 in Soissons, Aisne) is a retired French general. He was one of the five regional NATO commanders in Afghanistan, and was the highest-ranking French officer in Afghanistan between 6 August 2008 and 10 July 2009.

Career 
Stollsteiner joined the army in 1975, taking part in numerous operations in Africa (ex-Zaire, Centrafrique, Chad, Côte d'Ivoire) and in the Balkans (Sarajevo, Mitrovica), as well as in Afghanistan.

From 6 August 2008 to 10 July 2009, Stollsteiner served as a NATO regional commander in Afghanistan, heading the Regional Command Capital at Camp Warehouse, under US generals David D. McKiernan and Stanley A. McChrystal. He also served in the capacity of REPFRANCE, representing the head of staff of the military on the Afghan theatre.

Stollsteiner supervised the sector where the Uzbin Valley ambush took place.

Honours 
 Officer of the Légion d'Honneur
 Officer of the Ordre du Mérite

Notes and references 

1956 births
Living people
People from Soissons
French generals
French military personnel of the War in Afghanistan (2001–2021)